This is an incomplete list of existing, reputable zoos in the United States. For a list of aquaria, see List of aquaria in the United States, and for a list of nature centers, see List of nature centers in the United States.

Zoos are primarily terrestrial facilities where animals are held in enclosures and displayed to the public for education and entertainment. Animals may be bred, as well, to maintain captive populations and kept under veterinary care. These facilities include zoos, safari parks, animal theme parks, aviaries, butterfly zoos, reptile centers, and petting zoos, as well as wildlife sanctuaries and nature reserves where visitors are allowed. Zoos in the United States show great diversity in both size and collection. Many are notable for ongoing global wildlife conservation and captive breeding efforts, especially for endangered animal species.

Alabama

Alabama Gulf Coast Zoo, Gulf Shores
Alabama Safari Park, Hope Hull
Birmingham Zoo, Birmingham
Harmony Park Safari, Huntsville
Montgomery Zoo, Montgomery

Alaska

Alaska Wildlife Conservation Center, Portage
Alaska Zoo, Anchorage

Arizona

Arizona-Sonora Desert Museum, Tucson
Bearizona Wildlife Park, Williams
Heritage Park Zoological Sanctuary, Prescott
Keepers of the Wild, Valentine
Navajo Nation Zoological and Botanical Park, Window Rock
Out of Africa Wildlife Park, Camp Verde
Phoenix Zoo, Phoenix
Reid Park Zoo, Tucson
Wildlife World Zoo, Litchfield Park

Arkansas

Arkansas Alligator Farm and Petting Zoo, Hot Springs
Little Rock Zoo, Little Rock

California

Big Bear Alpine Zoo, Big Bear Lake
California Living Museum, Bakersfield
California Science Center, Los Angeles
Charles Paddock Zoo, Atascadero
CuriOdyssey, San Mateo
Folsom City Zoo Sanctuary, Folsom
Fresno Chaffee Zoo, Fresno
Happy Hollow Park & Zoo, San Jose
Living Coast Discovery Center, Chula Vista
Living Desert Zoo and Gardens, Palm Desert
Los Angeles Zoo, Los Angeles
Micke Grove Zoo, Lodi
Oakland Zoo, Oakland
Orange County Zoo, Orange 
Palo Alto Junior Museum and Zoo, Palo Alto
Sacramento Zoo, Sacramento
Safari West, Santa Rosa
San Diego Zoo, San Diego
San Diego Zoo Safari Park, Escondido
San Francisco Zoo, San Francisco
Santa Ana Zoo, Santa Ana
Santa Barbara Zoo, Santa Barbara
Sequoia Park Zoo, Eureka
Shambala Preserve, Acton, California

Colorado

Cheyenne Mountain Zoo, Colorado Springs
Colorado Gators Reptile Park, Mosca
Denver Zoo, Denver
Pueblo Zoo, Pueblo

Connecticut

Beardsley Zoo, Bridgeport
Ripley Waterfowl Conservancy, Litchfield

Delaware

3 Palms Zoo & Education Center, Clayton
Brandywine Zoo, Wilmington

District of Columbia
National Zoological Park, Washington, D.C.

Florida

Brevard Zoo, Melbourne
Busch Gardens Tampa, Tampa, Florida
Central Florida Zoo and Botanical Gardens, Sanford
Disney's Animal Kingdom, Bay Lake
Flamingo Gardens, Fort Lauderdale
Gatorland, Orlando
Gulf Breeze Zoo, Woodlawn Beach
Homosassa Springs Wildlife State Park, Homosassa Springs
Jacksonville Zoo and Gardens, Jacksonville
Lion Country Safari, Loxahatchee
Naples Zoo, Naples
Palm Beach Zoo, West Palm Beach
Reptile World Serpentarium, St. Cloud
Santa Fe College Teaching Zoo, Gainesville
Sarasota Jungle Gardens, Sarasota
St. Augustine Alligator Farm Zoological Park, St. Augustine Beach
Tallahassee Museum, Tallahassee, Florida
Wild Florida Drive-Thru Safari and gator Park, Kenansville 
Zoo Miami, Miami
ZooTampa at Lowry Park, Tampa
ZooWorld, Panama City Beach

Georgia

Chehaw Park, Albany
North Georgia Wildlife and Safari Park, Cleveland
Oatland Island Wildlife Center, Savannah
Wild Animal Safari, Pine Mountain
Wild Adventures, Valdosta
Zoo Atlanta, Atlanta

Hawaii

Honolulu Zoo, Honolulu
Pana'ewa Rainforest Zoo, Hilo

Idaho

Zoo Idaho, Pocatello
Idaho Falls Zoo at Tautphaus Park, Idaho Falls
Zoo Boise, Boise
World Center for Birds of Prey, Boise
Yellowstone Bear World, Rexburg

Illinois

Brookfield Zoo, Brookfield
Cosley Zoo, Wheaton
Henson Robinson Zoo, Springfield
Lincoln Park Zoo, Chicago
Lords Park Zoo, Elgin
Miller Park Zoo, Bloomington
Niabi Zoo, Coal Valley
Peoria Zoo, Peoria
Phillips Park Zoo, Aurora
Randall Oaks Zoo, West Dundee
Santa's Village AZoosment Park, East Dundee
Scovill Zoo, Decatur
Summerfield Zoo, Belvidere
Wildlife Prairie Park, Hanna City

Indiana

Columbian Park Zoo, Lafayette
Fort Wayne Children's Zoo, Fort Wayne
Indianapolis Zoo, Indianapolis
Mesker Park Zoo, Evansville
Potawatomi Zoo, South Bend
Washington Park Zoo, Michigan City

Iowa

Blank Park Zoo, Des Moines
Storybook Hill Children's Zoo, Dubuque

Kansas

Clay Center Zoo, Clay Center
David Traylor Zoo of Emporia, Emporia
Great Bend Zoo, Great Bend
Hutchinson Zoo, Hutchinson
Insect Zoo at Kansas State, Manhattan
Lee Richardson Zoo, Garden City
Ralph Mitchell Zoo, Independence
Rolling Hills Zoo, Salina
Safari Zoological Park, Caney
Sedgwick County Zoo, Wichita
Sunset Zoo, Manhattan
Tanganyika Wildlife Park, Goddard
Topeka Zoo, Topeka
Wright Park Zoo, Dodge City

Kentucky

Ararat Ridge Zoo, Williamstown
Kentucky Down Under, Horse Cave
Kentucky Reptile Zoo, Slade
Louisville Zoo, Louisville

Louisiana

Alexandria Zoological Park, Alexandria
 Audubon Insectarium, New Orleans
Audubon Zoo, New Orleans
Baton Rouge Zoo, Baton Rouge
Global Wildlife Center, Folsom
Gone Wild Safari, Pineville
Louisiana Purchase Gardens and Zoo, Monroe
Zoosiana, Lafayette

Maine

Maine Wildlife Park, Gray
York's Wild Kingdom Zoo, York Beach

Maryland

 Catoctin Wildlife Preserve and Zoo, Thurmont
 The Maryland Zoo in Baltimore, Baltimore
 Plumpton Park Zoo, Rising Sun
 Salisbury Zoo, Salisbury

Massachusetts

Animal Adventures, Bolton
Buttonwood Park Zoo, New Bedford
Capron Park Zoo, Attleboro
Franklin Park Zoo, Boston
Lupa Zoo, Ludlow
Museum of Science, Boston
Southwick's Zoo, Mendon
Stone Zoo, Stoneham
The Zoo in Forest Park, Springfield

Michigan

Binder Park Zoo, Battle Creek
Boulder Ridge Wild Animal Park, Alto
Children's Zoo at Celebration Square, Saginaw
Detroit Zoo, Royal Oak
DeYoung Family Zoo, Wallace
Garlyn Zoo, Naubinway
Indian Creek Zoo, Lambertville
John Ball Zoological Garden, Grand Rapids
Potter Park Zoo, Lansing
Roscommon Zoo, Roscommon
Wilderness Trails Zoo, Birch Run

Minnesota

Como Park Zoo and Conservatory, Saint Paul
Hemker Park & Zoo, Freeport
Lake Superior Zoo, Duluth
Minnesota Zoo, Apple Valley
Pine Grove Zoo, Little Falls
Reptile And Amphibian Discovery Zoo, Owatonna
Safari North Wildlife Park, Brainerd
Zollman Zoo, near Byron (a part of Oxbow Park)
Trowbridge Creek Zoo, Vergas

Mississippi

Hattiesburg Zoo, Hattiesburg
Jackson Zoo, Jackson
Tupelo Buffalo Park and Zoo, Tupelo

Missouri

Dickerson Park Zoo, Springfield
Grant's Farm, St. Louis
Kansas City Zoo, Kansas City
Promised Land Zoo, Eagle Rock and Branson
Saint Louis Zoo, St. Louis
Wonders of Wildlife Museum & Aquarium, Springfield
World Bird Sanctuary, Valley Park

Montana

Grizzly & Wolf Discovery Center, West Yellowstone
Montana Grizzly Encounter, Bozeman
Yellowstone Wildlife Sanctuary, Red Lodge
ZooMontana, Billings

Nebraska

Omaha's Henry Doorly Zoo and Aquarium, Omaha
Lee G. Simmons Conservation Park and Wildlife Safari, Ashland
Lincoln Children's Zoo, Lincoln
Riverside Park and Zoo, Scottsbluff

Nevada

Sierra Safari Zoo, Reno
Gilcrease Nature Sanctuary, Las Vegas

New Hampshire

Charmingfare Farm, Candia
Santa's Village, Jefferson
Squam Lakes Natural Science Center, Holderness

New Jersey

Bergen County Zoological Park, Paramus
Cape May County Park & Zoo, Cape May Court House
Cohanzick Zoo, Bridgeton
Popcorn Park Animal Refuge, Forked River
Space Farms Zoo and Museum, Beemerville
Turtle Back Zoo, West Orange

New Mexico

ABQ BioPark Zoo, Albuquerque
Alameda Park Zoo, Alamogordo
American International Rattlesnake Museum, Albuquerque
Hillcrest Park and Zoo, Clovis
Living Desert Zoo and Gardens State Park, Carlsbad
Spring River Zoo, Roswell
Wildlife West Nature Park, Edgewood

New York

Adirondack Animal Land, Gloversville
Animal Adventure Park, Harpursville
Bear Mountain State Park, Stony Point
Binghamton Zoo at Ross Park, Binghamton
Bronx Zoo, New York City (The Bronx)
Buffalo Zoo, Buffalo
Central Park Zoo, New York City (Manhattan)
Fort Rickey Discovery Zoo, Rome
Long Island Game Farm, Manorville
New York State Living Museum, Watertown
Prospect Park Zoo, New York City (Brooklyn)
Queens Zoo, New York City (Queens)
Rosamond Gifford Zoo, Syracuse
Seneca Park Zoo, Rochester
Staten Island Zoo, New York City (Staten Island)
Trevor Zoo, Millbrook
The Wild Animal Park, Chittenango
Utica Zoo, Utica
White Post Farms, Melville

North Carolina

Aloha Safari Zoo, Cameron
Greensboro Science Center, Greensboro
North Carolina Zoo, Asheboro
Tregembo Animal Park, Wilmington
Western North Carolina Nature Center, Asheville
Zootastic Park, Troutman

North Dakota

Chahinkapa Zoo, Wahpeton
Dakota Zoo, Bismarck
Red River Zoo, Fargo
Roosevelt Park Zoo, Minot

Ohio

African Safari Wildlife Park, Port Clinton
Akron Zoo, Akron
Boonshoft Museum of Discovery, Dayton
Cincinnati Zoo and Botanical Garden, Cincinnati
Cleveland Metroparks Zoo, Cleveland
Columbus Zoo and Aquarium, Columbus
The Farm at Walnut Creek, Walnut Creek
Kalahari Resorts, Sandusky
Lagoon Deer Park, Sandusky
Toledo Zoo, Toledo

Oklahoma

Oklahoma City Zoo and Botanical Garden, Oklahoma City
Tulsa Zoo and Living Museum, Tulsa

Oregon

Great Cats World Park, Cave Junction
Oregon Zoo, Portland
West Coast Game Park Safari, Bandon
Wildlife Safari, Winston

Pennsylvania

Claws-n-Paws Wild Animal Park, Lake Ariel
Clyde Peeling's Reptiland, Allenwood
Critter Country Animal Farm, Smithton
Elmwood Park Zoo, Norristown
Erie Zoo, Erie
Insectarium, Philadelphia
Keystone Safari Adventures, Grove City
Lake Tobias Wildlife Park, Halifax
Lehigh Valley Zoo, Schnecksville
Living Treasures Wild Animal Park, New Castle and Jones Mills
National Aviary, Pittsburgh
Philadelphia Zoo, Philadelphia
Pittsburgh Zoo & PPG Aquarium, Highland Park
Pocono Snake and Animal Farm, East Stroudsburg
Pymatuning Deer Park, Jamestown
ZooAmerica, Hershey

Rhode Island

Roger Williams Park Zoo, Providence

South Carolina

Alligator Adventure, North Myrtle Beach
Brookgreen Gardens, Murrells Inlet
Charles Towne Landing, Charleston
Greenville Zoo, Greenville
HollyWild Animal Park, Inman
Reptile Lagoon, Dillon
Riverbanks Zoo, Columbia

South Dakota

Bear Country USA, Rapid City
Bramble Park Zoo, Watertown
Great Plains Zoo and Delbridge Museum, Sioux Falls
Old MacDonald's Farm, Rapid City
Reptile Gardens, Rapid City

Tennessee

Brights Zoo, Limestone
Chattanooga Zoo at Warner Park, Chattanooga
Memphis Zoo, Memphis
Nashville Zoo at Grassmere, Nashville
Zoo Knoxville, Knoxville

Texas

Abilene Zoological Gardens, Abilene
Amarillo Zoo, Amarillo
Austin Zoo, Austin
Bear Creek Pioneers Park Wildlife Habitat and Aviary, Houston
Caldwell Zoo, Tyler
Cameron Park Zoo, Waco
Crocodile Encounter, Angleton
Capital of Texas Zoo, Cedar Creek
Dallas Zoo, Dallas
East Texas Zoo and Gator Park, Grand Saline
El Paso Zoo, El Paso
Ellen Trout Zoo, Lufkin
Fort Worth Zoo, Fort Worth
Fossil Rim Wildlife Center, Glen Rose
Frank Buck Zoo, Gainesville
Gladys Porter Zoo, Brownsville
Houston Zoo, Houston
Moody Gardens, Galveston
Natural Bridge Wildlife Ranch, New Braunfels
San Antonio Zoo, San Antonio
Sharkarosa Zoo, Pilot Point
The Texas Zoo, Victoria

Utah

Hogle Zoo, Salt Lake City
Tracy Aviary, Salt Lake City
Zootah, Logan

Virginia

Bluebird Gap Farm, Hampton
Busch Gardens Williamsburg, Williamsburg
Creation Kingdom Zoo, Gate City
Fort Chiswell Animal Park, Wythe
Leesburg Animal Park, Leesburg
Luray Zoo, Luray
Maymont, Richmond
Metro Richmond Zoo, Richmond
Mill Mountain Zoo, Roanoke
Natural Bridge Zoo, Natural Bridge
NOVA Wild, Reston
Virginia Living Museum, Newport News
Virginia Safari Park, Natural Bridge
Virginia Zoological Park, Norfolk

Washington

Cat Tales Zoological Park, Spokane
Cougar Mountain Zoo, Issaquah
Northwest Trek, Eatonville
Olympic Game Farm, Sequim
Point Defiance Zoo & Aquarium, Tacoma
Woodland Park Zoo, Seattle

West Virginia

Oglebay Good Zoo, Wheeling
Hovatter's Wildlife Zoo, Kingwood

Wisconsin

Alligator Alley, Wisconsin Dells
Animal Haven Zoo, Weyauwega
Bay Beach Wildlife Sanctuary, Green Bay
Bear Den Zoo and Petting Farm, Waterford
Concord Zoo, Concord
Henry Vilas Zoo, Madison
International Crane Foundation, Baraboo
Irvine Park Zoo, Chippewa Falls
Kewaunee County Bruemmer Park and Zoo
Lincoln Park Zoo, Manitowoc
Menominee Park Zoo, Oshkosh
Milwaukee County Zoo, Milwaukee
Northeastern Wisconsin Zoo, Green Bay
Ochsner Zoo, Baraboo
Racine Zoo, Racine
Shalom Wildlife Zoo, West Bend
Timbavati Wildlife Park, Wisconsin Dells
Wilderness Walk, Hayward
Wildwood Wildlife Park, Minocqua
Wildwood Zoo, Marshfield
Wisconsin Deer Park, Wisconsin Dells
Wisconsin Rapids Municipal Zoo, Wisconsin Rapids

See also 

List of AZA member zoos and aquaria
List of aquaria in the United States
List of nature centers in the United States
List of WAZA member zoos and aquariums
List of zoos by country

Footnotes

Further reading

 Daniel E. Bender, The Animal Game: Searching for Wildness at the American Zoo. Cambridge, MA: Harvard University Press, 2016.
 Lisa Uddin, Zoo Renewal: White Flight and the Animal Ghetto. Minneapolis, MN: University of Minnesota Press, 2015.

 
Zoos
Zoos in the United States
Zoos
United States
Zoos